Players and pairs who neither have high enough rankings nor receive wild cards may participate in a qualifying tournament held one week before the annual Wimbledon Tennis Championships.

Seeds
The top 4 seeds received a bye into the second round.

  Ayako Hirose /  Yone Kamio (second round)
  Jenny Byrne /  Nicole Pratt (qualified)
  Camille Benjamin /  Tracey Morton (qualifying competition, lucky losers)
  Kate McDonald /  Kirrily Sharpe (qualified)
  Amy deLone /  Erika deLone (second round)
  Natalia Egorova /  Svetlana Parkhomenko (qualifying competition, lucky losers)
  Tessa Price /  Dinky van Rensburg (qualified)
  Kristin Godridge /  Joanne Limmer (qualified)

Qualifiers

  Tessa Price /  Dinky van Rensburg
  Kate McDonald /  Kirrily Sharpe
  Kristin Godridge /  Joanne Limmer
  Jenny Byrne /  Nicole Pratt

Lucky losers

  Heidi Sprung /  Danielle Thomas
  Natalia Egorova /  Svetlana Parkhomenko
  Camille Benjamin /  Tracey Morton
  Emily Bond /  Claire Taylor

Qualifying draw

First qualifier

Second qualifier

Third qualifier

Fourth qualifier

External links

1993 Wimbledon Championships – Women's draws and results at the International Tennis Federation

Women's Doubles Qualifying
1993
Wimbledon Championships